Shorea cordata is a species of plant in the family Dipterocarpaceae. The species name cordata is derived from Latin (cordatus = heart-shaped) and refers to the shape of the leaf base. It is an emergent tree, up to 50 m, found in mixed dipterocarp forest on clay-rich soils over igneous rock.

Shorea cordata is endemic to Borneo, being found in Sarawak and NW Kalimantan. It is threatened by habitat loss.

References

cordata
Endemic flora of Borneo
Trees of Borneo
Taxonomy articles created by Polbot